Nesset is a former municipality in Møre og Romsdal county, Norway on the Romsdal Peninsula. The administrative centre was the village of Eidsvåg. Other population centers included Rausand, Boggestranda, Myklebostad, Eresfjord, and Eikesdalen.

Mardalsfossen, one of Norway's tallest waterfalls, a popular tourist attraction during the tourist season, is located in Nesset, along the shores of the lake Eikesdalsvatnet.

At the time if its dissolution in 2020, the  municipality is the 100th largest by area out of the 422 municipalities in Norway. Nesset is the 267th most populous municipality in Norway with a population of 2,946.

General information

The parish of Nesset was established as a municipality on 1 January 1838 (see formannskapsdistrikt law). On 1 January 1890, all of Nesset south of the Langfjorden was separated to form the new municipality of Eresfjord og Vistdal. This split left Nesset with 1,706 residents. On 1 January 1877, the Sotnakken farm on the Romsdal peninsula (population: 19) was transferred from Nesset to the neighboring Bolsøy municipality. Also on that date, the Tiltereidet and Meisalstranda areas (population: 212) of Tingvoll Municipality, along the west coast of the Tingvollfjorden, were transferred to Nesset Municipality. On 1 January 1890, the Bersås, Nævergjeld, Rausandhaugen, and Rausand area (population: 101) was transferred from Tingvoll Municipality (along the Tingvollfjorden) to Nesset Municipality.

During the 1960s, there were many municipal mergers across Norway due to the work of the Schei Committee. On 1 January 1964, Eresfjord og Vistdal Municipality was merged back into Nesset Municipality. Prior to the merger, Nesset had 2,360 residents.

On 1 January 2020, the municipality of Nesset merged with the neighboring municipalities of Molde and Midsund to form a much larger Molde Municipality.

Name
The municipality (originally the parish) is named after the old Nesset farm and vicarage (spelled "Nødesetter" in 1520) since this is where the old Nesset Church was located. The first element is probably nes which means "headlands"  (since the farm is lying on a prominent headland between the Langfjorden and the Tingvollfjorden) and the last element is setr or sætr which means "farm". Before 1889, the name was written Næsset.

Coat of arms
The coat of arms was granted on 10 March 1986. The broken gray line symbolizes the two stage drop on one of Europe's highest waterfalls, the Mardalsfossen, which is located in the municipality. The designer was Olav Sandø, from Eidsvåg.

Churches
The Church of Norway had four parishes within the municipality of Nesset. It is part of the Indre Romsdal prosti (deanery) in the Diocese of Møre.

Government
The municipal council of Nesset was made up of 21 representatives that are elected to four year terms. The party breakdown for the final municipal council was as follows:

Geography

The municipality is made up mostly of the Eikesdalen valley which surrounds the lake Eikesdalsvatnet. The lake is fed from the lake Aursjøen on the border of Oppland county. The water then flows through the Aura River into the lake Eikesdalsvatnet. That water then flows into the river Eira and then on to the Eresfjorden, a branch of the Langfjorden which itself is a branch off the great Romsdal Fjord. The mountains Skjorta, Fløtatinden, and Gjuratinden surround the main valley.

Birdlife
One area worth checking is Eidsvågleirene. Though the selection of species will not be high, several of the commoner species can be found. The grey heron and mallard are characteristic species in the area.

See also
List of former municipalities of Norway

References

External links

Municipal fact sheet from Statistics Norway 

 
Molde
Former municipalities of Norway
1838 establishments in Norway
2020 disestablishments in Norway
Populated places disestablished in 2020